In the United States, Homestead protection permits the borrower of a United States Department of Agriculture (USDA) loan to convey their agricultural property to the USDA if they can no longer make the loan payments

When a  borrower lacks the financial resources to make payments on a delinquent USDA farm loan, is ineligible for a restructured loan, and is unable to buy out the loan at the net recovery value of the collateral property,  the USDA will accept the property in lieu of payments.

References 

United States Department of Agriculture